Florian Oßner (born 5 July 1980) is a German politician of the Christian Social Union (CSU) who has been serving as a member of the Bundestag since the 2013 elections.

Political career 
Oßner became member of the Bundestag after the 2013 German federal election. He is a member of the Budget Committee and the Committee on Transport and Digital Infrastructure. In addition to his committee assignments, he is part of the German-American Parliamentary Friendship Group and the German-Austrian Parliamentary Friendship Group.

In the negotiations to form a coalition government under the leadership of Chancellor Angela Merkel following the 2017 federal elections, Oßner was part of the working group on municipalities and rural areas, led by Reiner Haseloff, Kurt Gribl and Michael Groschek.

Other activities 
 Federal Network Agency for Electricity, Gas, Telecommunications, Posts and Railway (BNetzA), Alternate Member of the Rail Infrastructure Advisory Council

References

External links 

 Bundestag biography 

1980 births
Living people
Members of the Bundestag for Bavaria
Members of the Bundestag 2021–2025
Members of the Bundestag 2017–2021
Members of the Bundestag 2013–2017
People from Vilsbiburg
Members of the Bundestag for the Christian Social Union in Bavaria